Bryobium dischorense, commonly known as the spotted urchin orchid, is an epiphytic or lithophytic clump-forming orchid that has fleshy, oval pseudobulbs, each with a single thin leaf and between four and eight cup-shaped, cream-coloured or whitish flowers with red spots.  This orchid occurs in New Guinea and Queensland.

Description
The side lobes are large and erect and the middle lobe is short and turns downwards. Flowering occurs from October to December.

Taxonomy and naming
The spotted urchin orchid was first formally described in 1912 by Rudolf Schlechter who gave it the name Eria dischorensis and published the description in Repertorium Specierum Novarum Regni Vegetabilis Beihefte. In 2002 Mark Clements and David Jones changed the name to Bryobium dischorense. The specific epithet (dischorense) refers to the type location, which Schlechter referred to as the Dischore Range, now known as the Bowutu Range. The ending -ense being a Latin suffix meaning "denoting place", "locality" or "country".

Distribution and habitat
Bryobium dischorense usually grows on rainforest trees. It is found in New Guinea and in the Whitfield Range in Queensland.

References

dischorense
Orchids of New Guinea
Orchids of Queensland
Plants described in 1912